Hesler Enrique Phillips Baca (born 18 November 1978) is a Honduran former football player.

Club career
Phillips played for Universidad and Victoria with whom he got relegated in 2003. He returned to Universidad and later joined Platense.

International career
Phillips was part of the Honduras Olympic squad which qualified for the Summer Olympics for the first time in 2000. He did however not make the Olympic Games roster.

He made his senior debut for Honduras in a May 1999 friendly match against Haiti and has earned a total of 6 caps, scoring 1 goal. He was a non-playing squad member at the 2000 CONCACAF Gold Cup and played at the 2001 Copa América.

His final international was a July 2001 Copa América match against Uruguay.

International goals
Scores and results list Honduras' goal tally first.

References

External links

1978 births
Living people
People from Valle Department
Association football forwards
Honduran footballers
Honduras international footballers
1998 CONCACAF Gold Cup players
2001 Copa América players
C.D. Victoria players
Platense F.C. players
Liga Nacional de Fútbol Profesional de Honduras players